Harry Clement Croxton (February 1880 – February 1965) was an English footballer who played as a half-back. He made 206 appearances (116 in the Football League) and scored 11 times (7 in the football league) for Burslem Port Vale in two spells from 1901 to 1911. He spent 1905 to 1908 at Stoke, making 24 league and cup appearances, scoring one goal.

Career
Croxton joined Burslem Port Vale from Burslem Park in March 1901, and soon became a regular in the side, making 28 appearances for the Second Division side in 1901–02. He played seventeen games in 1902–03, before he became an ever-present throughout the 39 game 1904–05 season. He scored his first goal in senior football on 27 February, in what was a 6–2 victory over Leicester Fosse at the Athletic Ground. He was also an ever-present in the forty game 1904–05 season, scoring in draws with Bradford City and Lincoln City, he also bagged Vale's consolation goal in an 8–1 thumping from Liverpool at Anfield. He scored in a 3–2 win over Chelsea on 30 October, but after making fourteen appearances in 1905–06, he was sold to rivals Stoke in November 1905.

He played eighteen times for the "Potters" in 1905–06, hitting the net in a 4–0 win over Wolverhampton Wanderers at the Victoria Ground. He started the first six games in 1906–07 but Stoke failed to win a match and Croxton was never give a chance again losing his place to George Baddeley who was returning from injury. Stoke suffered relegation at the end of the season after finishing bottom of the First Division. He was absent completely in 1907–08, after which Stoke resigned from the Football League due to financial problems.

Croxton returned to Port Vale in December 1908 and went straight back into the first team. However the club had resigned from the Football League in 1907, and were now competing in the North Staffordshire & District League. He helped the club to both top the division and lift the Staffordshire Junior Cup in 1910, before he retired from football the following year.

Personal life
Until 1933 he owned the Pack Horse Inn at Longport, near Burslem. He had a family of four daughters and three sons. His eldest son, also named Harry, became a director of Chivers and had a daughter, Jennifer, who became a RADA trained actress and appeared in the celebrated 1960s spy-fi series The Avengers. One of his daughters, Clara, won the Staffordshire ballroom dancing championship in 1937 with her partner, Basset Riseley, whose father was Lord Mayor of Stoke-on-Trent.

Career statistics
Source:

Honours
Port Vale
 North Staffordshire & District League: 1909–10
 Staffordshire Junior Cup: 1910

References

1880 births
1965 deaths
Footballers from Stoke-on-Trent
English footballers
Association football defenders
Port Vale F.C. players
Stoke City F.C. players
English Football League players